Claire Veronica Broome (born August 24, 1949) is an American epidemiologist, specializing in public health surveillance and vaccine evaluation, who has contributed to the development and effective utilization of key vaccines against pathogens causing pneumonia and meningitis.

Biography

Claire Broome was born in Tunbridge Wells, England, on August 24, 1949, the daughter of Heather (Platt), a chemist and technical librarian, and Kenneth R. Broome, a civil engineer. The family emigrated to the United States in 1952.  She earned a baccalaureate magna cum laude in biochemistry from Harvard University (Cambridge, MA) in 1970, and an MD from Harvard Medical School (Boston, MA) in 1975.

Following a residency in internal medicine at the University of California, San Francisco (1975–77), she joined the Centers for Disease Control (CDC) as an Epidemic Intelligence Service (EIS) officer (1977–79) and served with the CDC for 28 years, eventually holding the positions of deputy director (1994–99), acting CDC director (1998), and senior advisor for integrated heath information systems (2000–06). In 1995 she was promoted to assistant surgeon general in the US Public Health Service.

During this period, Dr. Broome served as a chairperson for the World Health Organization (WHO) Steering Committee for Encapsulated Bacteria, which was responsible for funding and implementing a research portfolio on vaccines needed to prevent bacterial meningitis and pneumonia in developing countries (part of the WHO Programme for Vaccine Development, a predecessor of the CVI and GAVI).

From 1999 to 2006, she led the development and implementation of the National Electronic Disease Surveillance System (NEDSS), a project to transform public health surveillance in the US by electronic transmission of public health relevant clinical lab test results to state public health departments. These systems use the same standards which have been endorsed for clinical Electronic Health records; the majority of states in the country are now implementing one or more NEDSS functions. She also served as CDC's participant in national public private consortia to accelerate standards based Electronic Health Records.

Key scientific contributions
At the CDC, Broome contributed to the understanding of several diseases of high public interest including Legionnaires' Disease, pneumococcal vaccine evaluation, meningococcal disease and Toxic Shock Syndrome. Notable accomplishments included development of a new method for observational measurement of the effectiveness of the pneumoccal polysaccharide vaccine (the "indirect cohort" or "Broome" method), which has been used since then to assess serotype specific effectiveness, duration of effectiveness, and effectiveness in groups with underlying disease; designed observational and field trials to evaluate vaccine performance, including sequential case control studies to define duration of meningococcal polysaccharide vaccine effectiveness in Burkina Faso; a cluster randomized trial of Group B meningococcal vaccine efficacy in Cuba; and Haemophilus influenzae type b conjugate vaccine impact on pneumonia in the Gambia; creation of funded population based active surveillance sites for 5 invasive bacterial pathogens (the forerunner of domestic Emerging Infections Programs); and demonstration that epidemic and sporadic listeriosis was a food-borne disease.

Awards
Broome was elected to the Institute of Medicine in 1996 (now the National Academy of Medicine). Professional awards include the PHS Distinguished Service Award; the Surgeon General's Medallion; the Infectious Disease Society of America's Squibb Award for Excellence of Achievement in Infectious Diseases; the John Snow Award from the American Public Health Association, Epidemiology Section; 2020 Maxwell Finland Award for Scientific Achievement, National Foundation for Infectious Diseases; 2021 Schneerson-Robbins Prize, 15th Vaccine Congress; Charles Shepard Award 1986; Langmuir Award co-author 1981, 1983, 1988, 1989, 1993.

References

1949 births
Living people
American women epidemiologists
American epidemiologists
Members of the National Academy of Medicine
Harvard Medical School alumni
British emigrants to the United States
21st-century American women
Harvard College alumni